Notable primary and secondary schools during the Ottoman Empire included:

Adana Vilayet
 Tarsus

Adrianople (Edirne) Vilayet
 Adrianople (Edirne)
 Bulgarian Men's High School of Adrianople

Aidin Vilayet
 Smyrna (now İzmir)
 American Collegiate Institute
 American Boys’ School
 İzmir Özel Saint-Joseph Fransız Lisesi

Beirut Vilayet
 Beirut
 American Community School Beirut
 Collège Notre Dame de Jamhour
 Collège de la Sagesse
 Grand Lycée Franco-Libanais
 Lycée Abdel Kader
 Mount Lebanon Mutasarrifate (now in Lebanon)
 Brummana High School in Brummana
 Collège Saint Joseph – Antoura in Antoura
 International School of Choueifat – Lebanon in Choueifat

Constantinople (Istanbul) Vilayet
 Constantinople (modern name: Istanbul and all now in Turkey)
 American Academy for Girls (now Üsküdar American Academy)
 Berberian School
 Deutsche Schule Istanbul
 Lycée de Galatasaray
 Getronagan Armenian High School
 Great National School (Megalē tou Genous scholē)
 İnas İdadisi/İnas Sultanisi (now Istanbul Girls High School)
 Kuleli Military High School
 Liceo Italiano di Istanbul
 Lycée Notre Dame de Sion Istanbul
 
 Lycée Saint-Joseph, Istanbul
 
 Robert College
 Robert College Community School
 St. George's Austrian High School
 Zappeion - Established in 1875, it was a school for girls catering to the Greek population. , an ethnic Turk, attended this school. Johann Strauss, author of "Language and power in the late Ottoman Empire," described it as "prestigious".

Mamuret-ul-Aziz Vilayet
 Harput (now in Elazığ)
 Euphrates College

Mutasarrifate of Jerusalem
 Jaffa
 Collège des Frères de Jaffa
 Mikveh Israel
 Jerusalem
 Talitha Kumi School (moved to Beit Jala, State of Palestine)
 Schmidt's Girls College (now in East Jerusalem, under Israeli administration)
 Ramallah
 Ramallah Friends Schools

Monastir Vilayet
 Monastir (Bitola)
 Monastir Military High School

Salonica (Thessaloniki) Vilayet
 Salonika (Thessaloniki)
 American Farm School
 Bulgarian Men's High School of Thessaloniki
 French School of Thessaloniki
 German School of Thessaloniki

Sivas Vilayet
 Merzifon
 Anatolia College in Merzifon

See also
 Education in the Ottoman Empire
For areas formerly part of the empire:
 List of schools in Bulgaria
 List of schools in Greece
 List of schools in Israel
 List of schools in Jordan
 List of schools in Lebanon
 List of schools in Saudi Arabia (for the Hejaz)
 List of schools in Syria
 List of high schools in Turkey

References

Ottoman Empire
Education in the Ottoman Empire
Schools